The 2014 Florida Tech Panthers football team represented the Florida Institute of Technology (FIT) during the 2014 NCAA Division II football season.  They were led by head coach Steve Englehart, who was in his second year at Florida Tech.  The Panthers played their home games at Pirate Stadium, approximately one mile from the Florida Tech campus and were a member of the Gulf South Conference.  The 2014 season was the Panthers' second, after having football approved at FIT in April, 2010.

The Panthers would record the first winning season in program history at 6-5. Highlights included the program's first ever win over a ranked team in a 37-31 victory over #12 Tarleton State at AT&T Stadium in Arlington, Texas as part of the Lone Star Football Festival 
, their first ever road win in GSC play thanks to a last second 33-32 win at West Alabama  and clinching a winning record on a 41-yard Hail Mary touchdown pass from Mark Cato to Xavier Milton as time expired to defeat Shorter, 34-30.

Schedule

Game summaries

at Stetson

Ave Maria

Tarleton State

at Bethune-Cookman

Delta State

at West Alabama

North Alabama

Mississippi College

at Shorter

at West Georgia

Valdosta State

Awards and milestones

Gulf South Conference honors

Nine players from Florida Tech were honored as All-GSC selections by the league's coaches. Wide Receiver Xavier Milton was named the GSC Co-Offensive Player of the Year with West Alabama QB Kyle Caldwell, becoming the first Panther to receive the honor. Quarterback Mark Cato became the first of two consecutive Panthers to win GSC Offensive Freshman of the Year with Antwuan Haynes winning it the following year. Steve Englehart was named GSC Co-Coach of the Year with Delta State's Todd Cooley and would go on to win the award outright in 2015.

Gulf South Conference Co-Offensive Player of the Year: WR Xavier Milton
Gulf South Conference Offensive Freshman of the Year: QB Mark Cato
Gulf South Conference Co-Coach of the Year: Steve Englehart

Gulf South Conference All-Conference First Team

Trevor Sand, RB
Xavier Milton, WR
Gabe Hughes, TE
J.J. Sanders, LB

Gulf South Conference All-Conference Second Team

Mark Cato, QB
Ramsey Sellers, C
Matt Garcia, T
Chris Stapleton, LB
Manny Abad, DB

Gulf South Conference offensive player of the week
September 8: Mark Cato 
November 3: Xavier Milton

Gulf South Conference defensive player of the week
September 22: J.J. Sanders  
September 29: Chris Stapleton 
November 3: J.J. Sanders

Gulf South Conference freshman of the week
September 8: Mark Cato 
September 15: Mark Cato Mark Cato 
September 22: Mark Cato  
September 28: Mark Cato 
October 13: Mark Cato  
October 20: Terrance Bynum 
October 27: Mark Cato 
November 3: Mark Cato 
November 17: Mark Cato

School records
Most passing yards in a single season: 2,962, Mark Cato
Most rushing yards in a single season: 1,105, Trevor Sand
Most receiving yards in a single season: 1,116, Xavier Milton 
Most passing touchdowns in a single season: 32, Mark Cato
Most sacks in a single season: 8, J.J. Sanders
Most tackles for loss in a single season: 21, J.J. Sanders
Most tackles for loss: 4, J.J. Sanders (October 18, 2014)

References

Florida Tech
Florida Tech Panthers football seasons
Florida Tech Panthers football